Clubul Sportiv Dinamo București is a Romanian handball club based in Bucharest, that competes in the Liga Națională, the top flight of Romanian handball. Nicknamed "the Red Dogs", the club was founded in 1948. The club's home ground is the Sala Polivalentă Dinamo in Sector 2, to which it moved in 2013. Dinamo București are among Romania's most successful clubs, having won over twenty competitive honours, including 18 top-flight titles, 7 Romanian Cups, 5 Romanian Supercups, and 1 EHF Champions League. Dinamo București has rivalry with Steaua București.

Kits

Accomplishments

Domestic competitions
National League:
Winners   (18): 1959, 1960, 1961, 1962, 1964, 1965, 1966, 1978, 1986, 1995, 1997, 2005, 2016, 2017, 2018, 2019, 2021, 2022
Runners-up  (22): 1963, 1967, 1968, 1969, 1970, 1971, 1972, 1974, 1975, 1976, 1977, 1982, 1983, 1984, 1988, 1989, 1990, 1991, 2002, 2003, 2004, 2006
Third place  (6): 1973, 1979, 1981, 2001, 2007, 2009, 2015 
Romanian Cup:
Winners (7): 1979, 1982, 1988, 2017, 2020, 2021, 2022
Romanian Super Cup: 
Winners (5): 2016, 2018, 2019, 2020, 2022

International competitions
EHF Champions League:                           
Winners (1): 1965
Runners-up (1): 1963
Third place (4): 1959, 1960, 1967, 1979
EHF Cup Winners' Cup:  
Runners-up (1): 1983
Third place (1): 1989
EHF Cup:
Third place (1): 2004

 Double
Winners (2): 2016–17, 2020–21

Team

Staff
Staff for the 2022–23 season

  Sport Director: David Barrufet
  Head Coach: Xavier Pascual Fuertes
  Assistant Coach: Jordi Giralt Alberich
  Assistant Coach: Sebastian Bota
  Goalkeeping Coach: Makrem Missaoui
  Video Analyst: Ivan Pascual
  Masseur: Victor Semen
  Physiotherapist: Cătălin Elian Apostol
  Physical Trainer: Dragoș Luscan
  External Coordinator: Ovidiu Semen, Marius Pintea

Current squad
Squad for the 2022–23 season

Goalkeepers
 1  Alexandru Bucătaru
 22  Khalifa Ghedbane
 23  Saeid Heidarirad
Left Wingers
 20  Rareș Muntean
 24  Andrei Nicușor Negru
 28  Alex Pascual Garcia
Right Wingers
 6  Vlad Popa
 15  Valentin Ghionea (c)
 55  Andrii Akimenko
Line players
 74  Viachaslau Bokhan
 89  Mohamed Mamdouh
 99  Cédric Sorhaindo

Left Backs
7  Dan Racoțea
 47  Ante Kuduz
 90  Ali Zein 
 94  Robert Militaru 
Central Backs
 14  João Pedro Silva
 34  Lazar Kukić 
Right Backs
 18  Eduardo Gurbindo
 37  Stanislav Kašpárek
 51  Javier Humet

Out on loan
  Octavian Bizău (CB) (at  CSM București) until 2023
  Călin Dedu (LP) (at  Club Cisne de Balonmano) until 2023

Transfers
Transfers for the 2023–24 season

 Joining
  Petar Nenadić (LB) (from  Paris Saint-Germain) ?
  Daniel Stanciuc (CB) (from  CSU Suceava) ?
  Tudor Buguleț (RW) (from  CS Minaur Baia Mare) ?
  Miklós Rosta (LP) (from  SC Pick Szeged) ?

 Leaving
  Valentin Ghionea (RW) (retires) 
  Cédric Sorhaindo (LP)  (retires)

Transfers for the 2024–25 season

 Joining
  Vladimir Cupara (GK) (from  Telekom Veszprém) ?

 Leaving

Notable former players 

  Ion Mocanu
  Petre Ivănescu
  Mircea Costache II
  Cristian Zaharia
  Rudi Prisăcaru
  Ioan Moser
  Mihai Redl
  Ioan Bogolea
  Virgil Hnat  
  Ghiță Licu 
  Robert Licu
  Mircea Grabovschi
  Marin Dan
  Adrian Cosma 
  Cornel Penu 
  Valentin Samungi   
  Cornel Durău
  Alexandru Buligan
  Gheorghe Covaciu 
  Gheorghe Dogărescu 
  Eliodor Voica
  Vasile Oprea
  Rareș Jurcă
  Marian Cozma  
  Ibrahim Diaw
  Hugo Descat  
  Sajjad Esteki 
  Vitaly Komogorov
  Gustav Rydergård

External links
 Official website  
 Team's page at eurohandball.com 
 

Handball
Romanian handball clubs
Sport in Bucharest
Handball clubs established in 1953
1953 establishments in Romania
Liga Națională (men's handball)